The interactive accommodation process, or simply interactive process, refers to the collaborative effort involving an employer and employee to determine if the employee can return to work subsequent to an occupational or non-occupational injury, disease or disorder.

The process typically involves a face-to-face meeting with the employee and representatives for the employer (usually a human resources or risk management representative). The parties bring various ideas to the table regarding whether the employee can be accommodated in returning to their usual and customary (U&C) position or some other type of work. The parties may agree that a certain aspect of the U&C position can be modified, or alternative work found, to accommodate the employee's change in capacity.

Americans with Disabilities Act (1990) 
The Americans with Disabilities Act of 1990 mandates that all employers must engage in an interactive process to determine if a reasonable accommodation of the employee's disability can be made.

The Equal Employment Opportunity Commission (EEOC) defines the interactive process as: "an informal, interactive process ... [to] identify the precise limitations resulting from the disability and potential reasonable accommodations that could overcome those limitations."

Using a consultant 
Employers often hire outside consultants to help with requests for reasonable accommodation and facilitating the interactive process.

The consultant's main role is to act as an objective party and facilitate dialog between the employer and employee. Both parties benefit as the employer's exposure to an ADA action is reduced while the employee feels more comfortable having an objective, third-party involved in the process.

References 

Disability rights
Disability law in the United States